The Demographics & Workforce Group at the University of Virginia is a research and training organization responsible for producing annual population estimates for the Commonwealth of Virginia.

History
The Demographics & Workforce Group was first formed on June 1,
1940, when the Virginia State Planning Board appointed Lorin Thompson
as the director. The Demographics & Workforce Group began producing
Virginia county and city population estimates in the late 1950s. In
1967, when the United States Census Bureau undertook its Federal-State
Cooperative Program to improve population estimates, Governor Mills
Godwin designated the Demographics & Workforce Group Virginia's
"official source of statistics on population."

Legal Mandate
The Code of Virginia stipulates that the Weldon Cooper Center Demographics & Workforce Group's annual population estimates shall be preferred over those estimates produced by the Census Bureau and used in any governmental formulae or decisions requiring population estimates.

§ 15.2-4202. Definitions:

""Population," unless a different census is clearly set forth, means the number of inhabitants according to the United States census latest preceding the time at which any provision dependent upon population is being applied, or the time as of which it is being construed, unless there is available an annual estimate of population prepared by the Weldon Cooper Center for Public Service of the University of Virginia, which has been filed with the Department of Housing and Community Development, in which event the estimate shall govern"

Accuracy
In recent decades the University of Virginia Demographics &
Workforce Group's Virginia county and city population estimates have been shown to be more accurate than the Census Bureau's. The discrepancy between the two population estimates is in
large part due to Demographics and Workforce Group using an estimates
methodology ratio correlation that is more applicable to Virginia's
unique local government structure.

References

External links
 Demographics and Workforce Group
 The Weldon Cooper Center
 The University of Virginia

Demographics and Workforce Group
 
1944 establishments in Virginia